Edward George Farhat (June 7, 1926 – January 18, 2003) was an American professional wrestler, better known by his ring name The Sheik (often called The Original Sheik to distinguish him from The Iron Sheik, who debuted in 1972). Farhat is credited as one of the originators of the hardcore wrestling style. He was also the promoter of Big Time Wrestling, and the uncle of ECW wrestler Sabu. Farhat promoted his shows at Cobo Hall in Detroit and was the booker for Frank Tunney's shows at Maple Leaf Gardens in Toronto from 1971 to 1977.

Early life 
Edward George Farhat was born one of ten children in Lansing, Michigan, on June 7, 1926, to Lebanese immigrants. Unlike most of his older brothers, he did not attend college as myth says. His older brother Edmund did, which is where the confusion usually takes place. Edward quit school in the eighth grade and worked during the depression. He falsified his birth certificate in order to join the Army (possibly using his older brother Edmund's birth certificate) but eventually was drafted when he was 18. He was honorably discharged in 1946 after 18 months of service.

Professional wrestling career

Early life and career (1947–1960s)
Farhat's first match was actually as good old Eddie Farhat in January of 1947. It took a few years to start to develop the gimmick he is so fondly remembered by. Farhat started out wrestling in the Chicago area as The Sheik of Araby after having served in the U.S. Army, the privileged son of a wealthy, aristocratic Middle Eastern family. He also formed a tag team with Gypsy Joe, where they both captured the NWA Midwestern Tag Team Title in 1954, eventually moving to Texas. During his early career, in what could've been his biggest match at the time, the Sheik was set to face NWA World Heavyweight Champion Lou Thesz in Chicago for his title, but Thesz had a reputation for embarrassing "gimmick" wrestlers so The Sheik bailed from the ring and hid under a bus. The publicity from the event helped push the Sheik character to a more prominent level. He went to New York for Vincent J. McMahon where he teamed with Dick The Bruiser and Bull Curry in feuds against Mark Lewin and Don Curtis as well as the team of Antonino Rocca and Miguel Pérez in Madison Square Garden. On August 18, 1961, The Sheik was defeated by Buddy Rogers in a 2 out of 3 falls match at the Cincinnati Gardens.

The Sheik's gimmick (1949–1980s)
The Sheik's wrestling was centered on his character of a rich wild man from Syria. Clad with his keffiyeh, before each match, he would use stalling tactics as he would kneel on a prayer rug to pray to Allah (in real life Farhat was a Maronite Christian). He would lock on choke holds and refuse to break them, and use a camel clutch hold leading to submission. The hold would have him sit over his opponent's back as he applied a chinlock. He used hidden pencils (where he would wrap masking tape around it for better grip) and other "foreign objects" to cut open his opponent's faces. Often, the tactic backfired and the opponent got The Sheik's pencil, leading to the extensive scarring on Farhat's forehead. The other illegal move was his fireball that he threw into his opponents' faces, sometimes burning their face severely (he had pieces of paper soaked in lighter fluid which he quick lit with a cigarette lighter hidden in his trunks). He didn't speak on camera, apart from incomprehensible mutterings. At the start of his career, his wife Joyce played the part of his valet Princess Saleema who would burn incense in the ring. He had three different managers during his career to cut promos on his behalf. His first manager was Abdullah Farouk but when Farouk managed full-time in the WWF, Eddy Creatchman became his manager. When Creatchman was unable to work with him later in his career, Sheik had Supermouth Dave Drason.

World Wide Wrestling Federation (1965–1969, 1972)

In 1965, the Sheik made his return for the World Wide Wrestling Federation. On September 25, 1967, he had a 20-minute draw with Édouard Carpentier. In 1968, he was brought into the WWWF for title matches with then-champion Bruno Sammartino. They met three times in Madison Square Garden—Sheik won the first via count out on October 28, he was disqualified in the second November 18, and he lost to Bruno in a Texas Death Match via submission when Bruno grabbed a foreign object (pen) and hammered Sheik's arm to a bloody pulp on December 9. Sammartino and Sheik also had a series of matches in Boston in January and February 1969, including one sell out the day after a crippling snow storm, and public transportation not yet restored. They fought in three steel cage matches one in Philadelphia and two in Boston. On November 18, 1972, he lost to WWWF Champion Pedro Morales by count out at Boston Garden.

Noteworthy feuds and matches (1960s–1980)
The Sheik's biggest feud was his seemingly career-long conflict with Bobo Brazil in Big Time Wrestling in Detroit. The two feuded over Sheik's version of the United States Championship, frequently selling out Cobo Hall. This is seen briefly on the "documentary" movie, I Like to Hurt People. The two took the feud to several markets, most notably Memphis, Tennessee, and Los Angeles, California. His other major opponent in Los Angeles was Fred Blassie. Sheik and Blassie faced off several times, including cage matches in the Grand Olympic Auditorium. In 1967, the Sheik was wrestling a match when a fan pulled a gun and tried to shoot him three times. Fortunately, the gun didn't go off and the fan was arrested; the gun later fired when police tested it at a shooting range.

Starting in 1969, he also wrestled regularly in Toronto, where he was undefeated for 127 matches at Maple Leaf Gardens. He defeated the likes of Whipper Billy Watson, Lou Thesz, Gene Kiniski, Bruno Sammartino, Édouard Carpentier, Ernie Ladd, Chief Jay Strongbow, Tiger Jeet Singh, Johnny Valentine and even André the Giant during Andre's first extensive tour of North America in 1974. It was Andre who put an end to the Sheik's Toronto winning streak in August 1974 by disqualification. In 1976, he lost by pinfall to Thunderbolt Patterson and Bobo Brazil. Sheik continued to headline most shows in Toronto until 1977, but business dropped off significantly over the last three years. Few fans were aware of the fact that he was actually the booker within Frank Tunney's promotion following the retirement of Whipper Billy Watson in 1971. He was also the promoter at Cobo Hall in Detroit for many years. As business in Toronto failed, he worked for indy promoter Dave McKigney in Ontario and ran his own Big Time Wrestling promotion out of his home near Lansing, Michigan.

Late in his career, Sheik ventured to a promotion in Japan. His run was successful, but management was in financial ruin, so when the company went bankrupt, Sheik jumped to Baba's All Japan Pro Wrestling. He then jumped a year later to Inoki's New Japan Pro-Wrestling, but had a falling out with Inoki, and left Japan to return to wrestling full-time in Detroit. He returned in 1977 for All Japan, teaming, and feuding with, Abdullah the Butcher. He also teamed with Baba, Ricky Steamboat, and Kintaro Ohki. His match with Abdullah the Butcher against Dory Funk, Jr. and Terry Funk where Terry fought off Butcher and Sheik with his arm in a sling is credited for turning the foreign Funks into faces in Japan. A match between the two in Birmingham, Alabama, saw them battling out of the Boutwell Auditorium, where they held up traffic until the police broke it up, described as "just classic, bloody mayhem.”

Later career (1980–1998)
In 1980, Big Time Wrestling in Detroit ceased operations. Sheik wrestled for various territories throughout the United States and Japan through the 1980s. It was while in Japan that he suffered his first heart attack while boarding a taxi. From 1991 to 1995, he mainly wrestled in Japan for Frontier Martial-Arts Wrestling and had various dangerous death matches. On May 6, 1992, The Sheik had a "fire deathmatch" with Sabu against Atsushi Onita and Tarzan Goto, where the ring ropes were replaced with flaming barbed wire. Farhat got third-degree burns and went into a coma, nearly dying. In 1994, he had a brief run in Extreme Championship Wrestling where he teamed with Pat Tanaka against Kevin Sullivan and The Tazmaniac at The Night the Line Was Crossed. On May 5, 1995, he defeated Damián 666 for Frontier Martial-Arts Wrestling's 6th Anniversary show in a brief match, which ended up being his last. When Sabu joined WCW in 1995, Farhat joined him as his manager. During a match with Jerry Lynn, who was wrestling as "Mr. JL" at the time, Farhat's leg was broken by the wrestlers during a spot he was previously unaware of, forcing him to cease in-ring competition. In 1998, FMW held his official retirement ceremony in Japan which drew 56,000 people, when he was age 72, then retiring to his estate.

Death
Farhat died of heart failure around 3:15 AM at a Williamston, Michigan, hospital on January 18, 2003, having been admitted to that hospital earlier that year after a short illness. He was 76 years old, and at the time of his death was at the midst of writing his autobiography. Several publications, including The New York Times, noted that Farhat was 78 years old at the time of his passing. He is buried at the Mount Calvary Catholic Cemetery in Williamston, Michigan.

Legacy
In his later years, Farhat provided extensive interviews to his biographer with the intent of publishing a book on his life. These interviews provided a highly explosive look into the world of wrestling, especially on the early days of the WWWF/WWF and Japanese wrestling organizations. As a result, the interviews and draft book were sealed at the time of his death. The book titled Blood And Fire by Brian A Solomon was released in April 2022 by ECW Press. It is full of information on Farhat`s life and career.

The Sheik was seen as one of professional wrestling's biggest box office attractions, and as a pioneer of "hardcore wrestling" which became a major part of professional wrestling in the 1990s. On March 31, 2007, The Sheik was posthumously inducted into the WWE Hall of Fame by his nephew, Sabu, and Rob Van Dam, who he had trained. Most notably, he and Freddie Blassie trained boxer Muhammad Ali before Ali's famous "boxer vs wrestler match" with Antonio Inoki in 1976 in Tokyo. He also trained Greg Valentine and Scott Steiner, including independent stars such as "Machine Gun" Mike Kelly. Farhat was also known for short-changing wrestlers and employees on pay-outs, but he would also be a benefactor to a friend in need; according to Harley Race, after his wife died in an automobile accident and he was forced to take time off early in his career, The Sheik mailed him a check every week for a year until he could return to work. Farhat also had a reputation for living his gimmick everywhere; he didn't answer promoter phone calls for "Ed", not even for potential booking, telling the promoters "no Ed lives here". 

His wife, and former valet, Joyce, died on November 27, 2013, in Michigan, after being ill for some time. They are buried at Mount Calvary Catholic Cemetery in Williamston, Michigan. He was also the uncle of Michael Farhat, who worked as Mike Thomas in Detroit. Thomas died in 1978 at age 27. The Sheik's son Tom died on October 2, 2020, from kidney cancer at 57, and his eldest son Ed Farhat, Jr. - who wrestled under the name "Captain Ed George" - died from complications of COVID-19 on March 22, 2021, at the age of 70.

Championships and accomplishments
50th State Big Time Wrestling
NWA Hawaii Heavyweight Championship (1 time)
All Japan Pro Wrestling
World's Strongest Tag Determination League Outstanding Performance Award (1978) – with Abdullah the Butcher & Tor Kamata
World's Strongest Tag Determination League Exciting Award (1981) – with Mark Lewin
Big Time Wrestling
NWA United States Heavyweight Championship (Detroit version) (12 times)
Cauliflower Alley Club
Other honoree (1995)
Central States Wrestling
NWA United States Heavyweight Championship (Central States version) (1 time)
Frontier Martial Arts Wrestling
WWA World Martial Arts Heavyweight Championship (1 time)
International Championship Wrestling
ICW United States Heavyweight Championship (2 times)
Japan Wrestling Association
NWA United National Championship (1 time)
International Wrestling Association (Montreal)
IWA International Heavyweight Championship (3 times)
Maple Leaf Wrestling
NWA United States Heavyweight Championship (Toronto version) (4 times)
National Wrestling Alliance
NWA Hall of Fame (Class of 2010)
NWA Hollywood Wrestling
NWA Americas Heavyweight Championship (2 times)
Pro Wrestling Illustrated
PWI Most Hated Wrestler of the Year (1972)
PWI ranked him #368 of the top 500 singles wrestlers of the "PWI Years" in 2003
Professional Wrestling Hall of Fame and Museum
Professional Wrestling Hall of Fame (Class of 2011)
World Class Championship Wrestling
NWA Texas Heavyweight Championship (1 time)
World Wide Wrestling Federation/World Wrestling Entertainment
WWWF United States Heavyweight Championship (2 times)
WWE Hall of Fame (Class of 2007)
Wrestling Observer Newsletter
Wrestling Observer Newsletter Hall of Fame (Class of 1996)

See also 
 Big Time Wrestling

References

Sources
Birthday https://wrestlerdeaths.com/the-sheik-death
Tributes II by Dave Meltzer, 2004, pp 83–93

External links
WWE Hall of Fame Profile of The Sheik
The Sheik (Joseph Cabibbo) Profile
The Sheik at Find a Grave
 

1926 births
2003 deaths
20th-century professional wrestlers
American male professional wrestlers
American people of Lebanese descent
Big Time Wrestling (Detroit)
Sportspeople from Lansing, Michigan
Professional wrestlers from Michigan
Professional wrestling managers and valets
Professional wrestling trainers
Professional Wrestling Hall of Fame and Museum
Professional wrestling promoters
People from Williamston, Michigan
Sportspeople of Lebanese descent
WWE Hall of Fame inductees
FMW Brass Knuckles Heavyweight Champions
NWA United States Heavyweight Champions (Toronto version)
NWA Americas Heavyweight Champions
NWA United National Champions